Grand National Unity Party (Korean: 국민대통합당; lit. National Grand Unity Party) was a South Korean neoliberalist party.

History 
The party was formed by Jang Sung-min, a politician and broadcaster of the country, in 7 March 2017 and officially created on 3 April of that same year.

Originally, Jang intended to run as a presidential candidate of the People's Party. However, the party refused his entry due to the controversies about the Gwangju Uprising. He was forced to create this party and was automatically elected as the presidential candidate. However, his challenge ended unfortunately as he only received 0.06% of the vote.

On 13 February 2018, the party was dissolved. Jang went on to join the Bareunmirae Party.

References

External links
Website 

Defunct political parties in South Korea
Political parties established in 2017
2017 establishments in South Korea
Political parties disestablished in 2018
2018 disestablishments in South Korea
Liberal parties in South Korea